Aytaç Şaşmaz (born 4 August 1998) is a Turkish actor and musician.

Şaşmaz was born in Manisa. His brother, İsmail Ege Şaşmaz, is also an actor. After taking acting lessons, he made his cinematic debut in 2017 with a role in the youth film Kötü Çocuk alongside Tolga Sarıtaş and Afra Saraçoğlu. 

He played in the military series Söz which nominated International Emmy Awards. Then, He further rose to prominence with his performance in Hekimoğlu, an adaptation of American series House.

In 2021, he scored his first leading role as Bora Doğrusöz in the romantic comedy TV series Baht Oyunu opposite Cemre Baysel. Şaşmaz and Baysel started dating while shooting the series.

Filmography

Discography 
Singles
 "Barındığım Hikaye" (2020)
 "Vazgeçme" (2022)

References

External links 
 
 

1998 births
Living people
Turkish male film actors
Turkish male television actors